This article lists events from the year 2017 in Barbados.

Incumbents
Monarch: Elizabeth II
 Governor-General:  Elliott Belgrave (until 30 June); Philip Greaves (acting) (from 1 July)
 Prime Minister: Freundel Stuart

Events
September – Hurricane Irma

Sports
14 to 30 July – Barbados participated at the 2017 World Aquatics Championships with 4 competitors.

4 to 13 August – Barbados participated at the 2017 World Championships in Athletics with 7 competitors (5 men and 2 women) in 6 events.

Deaths
13 July – Keith Baird, Barbadian-born American linguist (born 1923).

11 October – Clifford Husbands, politician and judge, Governor-General 1996–2011 (b. 1926).

9 December – Charles Skeete, economist and diplomat (born c. 1938).

References

Links

 
2010s in Barbados
Years of the 21st century in Barbados
Barbados
Barbados